Debate Wars is a comedy debate show moderated by Michael Ian Black where two teams of comedians and improvisers enter the "Debatium" to settle, once and for all, the greatest arguments of all time – cats versus dogs, pie versus cake, babies versus old people – all in front of a live audience.

References
"Seeso Sets Launch Date For Comic ‘Debate Wars’ With Michael Ian Black." Deadline. N.p., 03 Aug. 2016. Web. 09 Dec. 2016.

External links
 

2016 American television series debuts
2016 American television series endings